Nora is a village in Jo Daviess County, Illinois, United States. In 2020, the population was 107, down from 121 according to the 2010 census, which was up from 118 in 2000.

History
Nora was named by a railroad official for a female settler. According to another source, the name "Nora" was selected on account of its brevity, Nora being a quite small place.

Geography

Nora is located at  (42.456072, -89.945113).

Demographics

As of the census of 2000, there were 118 people, 53 households, and 31 families residing in the village. The racial makeup of the village was 100.00% White.

There were 53 households, out of which 20.8% had children under the age of 18 living with them, 50.9% were married couples living together, 5.7% had a female householder with no husband present, and 41.5% were non-families. 39.6% of all households were made up of individuals, and 24.5% had someone living alone who was 65 years of age or older. The average household size was 2.23 and the average family size was 2.84.

In the village, the population was spread out, with 18.6% under the age of 18, 8.5% from 18 to 24, 27.1% from 25 to 44, 24.6% from 45 to 64, and 21.2% who were 65 years of age or older. The median age was 42 years. For every 100 females, there were 84.4 males. For every 100 females age 18 and over, there were 104.3 males.

The median income for a household in the village was $28,125, and the median income for a family was $50,208. Males had a median income of $26,000 versus $23,750 for females. The per capita income for the village was $17,608. There were 14.3% of families and 11.0% of the population living below the poverty line, including no under eighteens and none of those over 64.

Nora Elementary School (mascot Navahos) was a fixture of the town for years. In the early 1980s consolidation led to the school's closure and it was converted to apartments. Until the 1960s the town had a grocery store run by Belle Lutter, who claimed to have ridden Ulysses S. Grant's horse as a girl.

References

External links
Jo Daviess County

Villages in Jo Daviess County, Illinois
Villages in Illinois